Mcvaughia is a genus in the Malpighiaceae, a family of about 75 genera of flowering plants in the order Malpighiales. Mcvaughia contains only one species, Mcvaughia bahiana, a shrub occurring  in open shrubby vegetation (caatinga) on sandy soils of lowland Bahia, Brazil. It is related to Burdachia  and Glandonia. 

The genus was named in honor of the American taxonomist Rogers McVaugh (1909–2009).

References

Malpighiaceae Malpighiaceae - description, taxonomy, phylogeny, and nomenclature
Mcvaughia
Anderson, W. R. 1979. Mcvaughia, a new genus of Malpighiaceae from Brazil. Taxon 28: 157–161.

Malpighiaceae
Malpighiaceae genera
Monotypic Malpighiales genera